Gabby's Dollhouse is an American live-action/animated/interactive preschool series created by Traci Paige Johnson and Jennifer Twomey for Netflix. In the series, which first aired on January 5, 2021, Gabby (voiced by Laila Lockhart Kraner) and her cat friends go on adventures within her dollhouse.

The first episode was released as a sneak peek on YouTube on August 22, 2020, while the series itself was released on January 5, 2021. The second season premiered on August 10, 2021, while the third season premiered on October 19, 2021. The fourth season premiered on February 1, 2022, the fifth season premiered on July 25, 2022, the sixth season premiered on November 1, 2022, and the seventh season premiered on March 20, 2023.

Gabby’s Dollhouse made its linear debut on Cartoonito Latin America on April 18, 2022 and on Tiny Pop in the UK on October 17, 2022.

Characters

Main
 Gabby (voiced and portrayed by Laila Lockhart Kraner) is a 12-year-old girl who is the show's host, and has a magical cat headband which is able to shrink her down to toy-size.
 Floyd is Gabby's real-life tabby cat who makes his only appearance in the live-action sequences.
 Pandy Paws (voiced by Tucker Chandler) is a black and white Gabby Cat who is half-kitty/half-panda, and Gabby's sidekick and best friend. He starts off as a stuffed toy, but comes to life when he and Gabby shrink. He likes ambushing Gabby with "hug attacks".
 Carlita (voiced by Carla Tassara) is a purple and teal Gabby Cat who is half-kitty/half-car and drives around the dollhouse and likes playing games.
 Cakey (voiced by Juliet Donenfeld) is a small white Gabby Cat who is half-kitty/half-cupcake and makes sweet treats and snacks. He is able to create sprinkles, by either criticizing his actions or spinning around while being excited. He has four little cousins named Bakey, Flakey, Marshapan, and Paddycake.
 Daniel James "DJ" Catnip (voiced by Eduardo Franco) is a lavender Gabby Cat who wears a reddish-pink glittery hoodie which is able to stretch his tail and legs, in addition to mainly using them to play instruments. He also sometimes wears a visor over his eyes.
 CatRat (voiced by Donovan Patton) is a blue sneaky Gabby Cat with dark blue and light blue markings who pops up in every room. He likes everything shiny and sometimes plays the role of a villain.
 Pillow Cat (voiced by Sainty Nelsen) is a multi-colored Gabby Cat who is half-kitty/half-pillow. She likes making stories, and she usually takes "catnaps".
 Kitty Fairy (voiced by Tara Strong) is a pink half-kitty/half-fairy Gabby Cat with clear, pink and green wings, a pair of wishberry blossom-like antennae, a green flower-like dress and a flower crown. She makes garden magic with her tail, or her watering can.
 MerCat (voiced by Secunda Wood) is a turquoise Gabby Cat who is half-kitty/half-mermaid. She makes science "spa-themed".
 Baby Box (voiced by Maggie Lowe) is a young pink/peach Gabby Cat who is made of cardboard. She likes making crafts and is the daughter of Mama Box Cat. She did, sometimes, say her catchphrase: "Whoopsies!" (which would later become a song featured in the soundtrack for the series).
 Mama Box (voiced by Tara Strong) is a fuchsia/peach Gabby Cat who is the mother of Baby Box.

Supporting
 The Box Brothers (all voiced by Jude Schwartz) are the brothers of Baby Box and sons of Mama Box.
 Cupcake Cousins (respectively voiced by Henry Witcher, Archibald Englehardt, Mia Lynn, and Amari McCoy) are Cakey's four younger cousins who appeared in the episode "Cakey's Cupcake Cousins". Their names are Bakey, Flakey, Marshapan, and Paddycake. As such, the colors are, by the following order: Bakey is pink, Flakey is blue, Marshapan is green, and Paddycake is yellow. Flakey and Marshapan are male, and Bakey and Paddycake are female.
 Pete (voiced by Eric Lopez) is a polar bear who appears in the episode of the same name. He is a friend of Gabby and the Gabby Cats.
 Fluffy Flufferton (voiced by Elena Murray) is a feline pop star who appears in the episode of the same name. She later lives up to her name even more after her makeover.
 Luli-Loo (voiced by Halie Hrzich) is a young blue fairy Gabby Cat who appears in the episode "The Fairy Festival".
 Bitty Fairy (voiced by Thomas Bushell) (Info Needed)
 DJ Comet (voiced by Reggi Watkins) is a light green Gabby Cat who is DJ Catnip's alien cousin who appeared in "Mission to Caturn". He, like DJ Catnip, is able to stretch his tail and legs, but also to spin them around like a helicopter. He returns in the episode "Dollhouse Dress-Up Chest".
 Figgy (voiced by Rachel Ling Gordon) is a pink elf-like Gabby Cat who appears in the episode "A CAT-Tabulous Christmas".
 Kico (vocal effects provided by Juliet Donenfeld) is a young kitty-unicorn hybrid who appears in the episode of the same name.
 Santa Kitty (voiced by Darrell Brown) is an orange Gabby Cat who is this show's version of Santa Claus.
 Candy Cane is a red reindeer kitty who leads Santa Kitty's sleigh.
 The Hamster Kitties (vocal effects provided by Frank Welker) are tiny cat-hamster hybrids who occasionally appear in the series.
 The Dust Bunnies are cute small bunnies made of dust that sometimes show up.
 The Doodads are three Gabby Cats made of cardboard and other crafty things who are the rivals of Gabby, Pandy and Carlita during the Meow-Mazing Games.

Episodes

Season 1 (2021)

Season 2 (2021)

Season 3 (2021)

Season 4 (2022)

Season 5 (2022)

Season 6 (2022)

Season 7 (2023)

Format
Like Blue's Clues and most interactive preschool shows, Gabby's Dollhouse has built-in silences designed to encourage audience participation.

Each episode begins with the live-action Gabby playing in her bedroom. She then unboxes a miniature that is the catalyst for an adventure inside the animated world of her dollhouse. Gabby puts on her cat ears headband and shrinks down with her stuffed toy, Pandy Paws, who comes alive to surprise Gabby with a “hug attack.” Common rituals may involve an encounter with CatRat, who often randomly appears in one of the rooms in the dollhouse.

The dollhouse has seven key cat-themed rooms where Gabby’s adventures take place with the various Gabby Cats:
Bathroom, where MerCat does science experiments that are “spa” themed
Bedroom, where Pillow Cat tells stories and encourages make believe
Craft room, where Baby Box and her family teach how to make DIY projects
Fairy garden, where Kitty Fairy takes care of magical plants
Kitchen, where Cakey makes snacks and desserts decorated with cats
Music room, where DJ Catnip teaches how to play musical instruments
Playroom, where Carlita joins in physical education games

At the end of each episode is a “Cat of the Day” segment, where one of the Gabby Cats is selected to guide the viewer one-on-one in crafting, cooking, or singing.

Voice cast
 Laila Lockhart Kraner as Gabby
 Tucker Chandler as Pandy Paws
 Donovan Patton as CatRat
 Tara Strong as Mama Box and Kitty Fairy
 Juliet Donenfeld as Cakey and Kico the Kittycorn
 Sainty Nelsen as Pillow Cat
 Eduardo Franco as DJ Catnip
 Carla Tassara as Carlita
 Secunda Wood as MerCat
 Maggie Lowe as Baby Box
 Reggie Watkins as DJ Comet
 Rachel Ling Gordon as Figgy the Elf
 Eric Lopez as Pete
 Darrell Brown as Santa Kitty
 Elena Murray as Fluffy Flufferton
 Halie Hzirch as Luli-Loo
 Jude Schwartz as the Box Brothers
 Henry Witcher as Bakey
 Archibald Englehardt as Flakey
 Mia Lynn Bangunan as Marshapan
 Amari McCoy as Paddycake

Development
The show was created early in the COVID-19 pandemic. It was the first DreamWorks property where the creators were based in New York City instead of Los Angeles, and the whole production team, including the creators, were connected via videoconferencing, also a first for a DreamWorks production.

The basic themes of the show — dollhouses, miniatures, and cats — were creators Traci Page Johnson and Jennifer Twomey's favorites, while the concept of the "dollhouse deliveries" was inspired by unboxing videos, although tweaked so that instead of "unboxing a product", they "unbox a story". Initially, cats were not the main theme of the show — for example, the character of DJ Catnip was originally supposed to be a clock — but this was changed based on the trend of cat videos.

Early in the show's production, the creators came across Carol Dweck's book The Growth Mindset, which has led to the production team adopting the idea of celebrating mistakes and "failing fantastically", which is promoted on the show.

The soundtrack of the show includes genres not often found in children's shows, such as disco, which is due to the creators not liking "saccharine-y sweet music".

Home media
Gabby's Dollhouse: Cat-tastic Dance Along was released on DVD and digital download on February 1, 2022 by Universal Pictures Home Entertainment (through Studio Distribution Services LLC). It features 20 songs from the show with a group of kids dancing which is inspired by TikTok's sensation of dance challenges. The DVD and digital download also feature meditation sessions each one feature a Gabby Cat going into mindfulness mode. In United States. and released on DVD and digital download on TBA 2023 by Mediumrare Entertainment in United Kingdom and Ireland.

Reception
The show was nominated for a Kidscreen award in 2021 and released a series of show-themed toys for the 2021 holiday season. For the episode "Cakey's Cupcake Cousins", it was nominated for Best Animated Television/Broadcast Production for Preschool Children at the 50th Annie Awards.

References

External links
 Gabby's Dollhouse at Netflix
 

2020s American animated television series
2020s American children's television series
2020s preschool education television series
2021 American television series debuts
Television series by DreamWorks Animation
Netflix children's programming
American children's animated adventure television series
American children's animated fantasy television series
American computer-animated television series
American television series with live action and animation
American preschool education television series
Animated preschool education television series
Animated television series about cats
Animated television series about children
Television series about size change
English-language Netflix original programming